The A331 Highway, also known as the Vilyuy Highway, is a highway in Russia connecting Yakutsk to Tulun, the highway is 1,166 km (724 mi), the road is paved for first 31 mi from Yakutsk.

Major junctions

References 

Roads in Siberia